Taquarussu is a municipality located in the Brazilian state of Mato Grosso do Sul. Its population was 3,588 (2020) and its area is 1,041 km².

The municipality contains 21% of the  Rio Ivinhema State Park, created in 1998.

References

Municipalities in Mato Grosso do Sul